Henry Edward Field  (11 July 1903 – 28 March 1991) was a New Zealand educational psychologist, educationalist and university professor. He was born in Christchurch, New Zealand, on 11 July 1903.

In the 1973 New Year Honours, Field was appointed an Officer of the Order of the British Empire, for services to education.

References

1903 births
1991 deaths
New Zealand psychologists
New Zealand academics
New Zealand Officers of the Order of the British Empire
20th-century psychologists